Ballarat Wildlife Park is an interactive wildlife park situated in Ballarat, Australia which was opened by Greg Parker in 1987.

Animals
The Park currently holds around 400 species of animals, including free-roaming kangaroos and emus that can be handfed. Most of the animals are native to Australia including koalas, wombats, quokkas, echidnas and both saltwater and freshwater crocodiles. Some foreign animals include the dyeing poison dart frog, Komodo dragon, the American alligator and the Aldabra giant tortoise. The park was also home to the oldest-known living wombat in captivity, Patrick, who died in 2017 aged 32.

List of species

 Aldabra giant tortoise
 Alligator snapping turtle
 Alpaca
 American alligator
 Asian forest tortoise
 Australian green tree frog
 Australian water dragon
 Banded rock python
 Bare-nosed wombat
 Boa constrictor
 Broad-headed snake
 Brolga
 Brown tree snake
 Buff-banded rail
 Burmese python
 Bush stone-curlew
 Central bearded dragon
 Common snapping turtle
 Dingo
 Dyeing poison dart frog
 Eastern diamondback rattlesnake
 Eastern long-necked turtle
 Eastern tiger snake
 Eastern whipbird
 Eclectus parrot
 Emu
 Freshwater crocodile
 Frilled lizard
 Gila monster
 Goodfellow's tree-kangaroo
 Green anaconda
 Indochinese spitting cobra
 Inland taipan
 Kangaroo Island grey kangaroo
 Koala
 Komodo dragon
 Lace monitor
 Little penguin
 Magnificent tree frog
 Mangrove monitor
 Merten's water monitor
 Monocled cobra
 Noisy pitta
 Northern common blue-tongued lizard
 Pig-nosed turtle
 Queensland lungfish
 Quokka
 Red-bellied pademelon
 Red-rumped parrot
 Red-tailed black cockatoo
 Reticulated python
 Rhinoceros iguana
 Rusty monitor
 Saltwater crocodile
 Shingleback lizard
 Short-beaked echidna
 Southern cassowary
 Southern corroboree frog
 Southern hairy-nosed wombat
 Spiny-tailed monitor
 Spotted-tail quoll
 Tasmanian devil
 Tawny frogmouth
 Uracoan rattlesnake
 Wedge-tailed eagle
 White-headed pigeon

References

External links
 

1987 establishments in Australia
Zoos established in 1987
Ballarat
Zoos in Victoria (Australia)
Tourist attractions in Ballarat
Wildlife parks in Australia